George S. Harrison is the former Senior Vice President of Marketing and Corporate Communication at Nintendo of America.

Education
Harrison holds a bachelor's degree from the University of Connecticut in finance and holds a master's degree in marketing from the University of Wisconsin–Madison.

Career
Harrison was the director of marketing for Pepsi USA from 1981 to 1987, where he played a part in the Cola Wars. 

From 1987 to 1992, George Harrison worked as director of new ventures for Quaker Oats under PepsiCo.

George Harrison oversaw retail merchandising, publications, advertising, corporate communications and promotions at Nintendo of America. Harrison joined the company in March 1992 as Director of Advertising and Promotion. In July 1993, Harrison was promoted to the position of Director of Marketing and Corporate Communications. Harrison's most recent promotion was in 2001. 

Nintendo announced that its marketing offices would move from   Washington state to San Francisco or New York in July  2007, and on September 14, 2007 Harrison  said  "I have confirmed to all employees that I will be leaving at the end of December and not making the move to California".

Harrison left Nintendo in December 2007, and has since gone on to found the marketing consulting firm Harrison Insights.

References

External links

Nintendo people
Living people
University of Connecticut alumni
Year of birth missing (living people)
Wisconsin School of Business alumni
Video game businesspeople